Harold Wadsworth (4 October 1898 – 2 November 1975) was an English footballer who made over 250 appearances in The Football League for Liverpool, Leicester City, Nottingham Forest and Millwall.

Playing career 
Wadsworth started his career at local club Bootle St Matthews before he was signed by Tranmere Rovers.

Liverpool
He signed for Liverpool in 1919 and made 9 appearances in his debut season. He made 25 appearances the following season, but his playing time was considerably reduced during the next two seasons as Liverpool won back-to-back championships.

Leicester City
He moved to Leicester City in June 1924 and made 106 appearances for the club and helped Leicester win the Division Two title in 1924–25. He left in April 1927 for Nottingham Forest.

Nottingham Forest
Wadsworth spent a year in Division Two for Nottingham Forest in the 1927–28 season on the left wing.
He scored on his debut in the opening game of the season on 28 August 1927 in the 2–2 draw away at Port Vale and his last game was on 14 April 1928 at home to West Bromwich Albion.

He later played for Millwall.

Career statistics

References

1898 births
1975 deaths
English footballers
Leicester City F.C. players
Liverpool F.C. players
Millwall F.C. players
Nottingham Forest F.C. players
Tranmere Rovers F.C. players
English Football League players
Association football defenders